E. palustris  may refer to:
 Eimeria palustris, an apicomplexan parasite species that infects the marsh rice rat
 Eleocharis palustris, the common spike-rush, creeping spike-rush or marsh spike-rush, a plant species growing in wetlands throughout the Boreal Kingdom
 Epipactis palustris, the marsh helleborine, an orchid species

See also
 Palustris (disambiguation)